Marc-Andrea Hüsler was the defending champion but lost in the semifinals to Thanasi Kokkinakis.

Stefano Travaglia won the title after defeating Kokkinakis 7–6(7–4), 6–2 in the final.

Seeds

Draw

Finals

Top half

Bottom half

References

External links
Main draw
Qualifying draw

Sibiu Open - 1
2021